The 1940 Newcastle upon Tyne North by-election was a parliamentary by-election held on 7 June 1940 for the British House of Commons constituency of Newcastle upon Tyne North.

Previous MP
The seat had become vacant on when the constituency's Conservative Party Member of Parliament (MP), Sir Nicholas Grattan-Doyle, had resigned from Parliament on 10 April, aged 77.  He had been the constituency's MP since its creation for the 1918 general election.

Candidates
During World War II, unopposed by-elections were common, since the major parties had agreed not to contest by-elections when vacancies arose in seats held by the other parties; contests occurred only when independent candidates or minor parties chose to stand. In keeping with the agreement, neither the local Labour Party and Liberal Party fielded a candidate in Newcastle North.

The Conservative Party candidate was Henry Grattan-Doyle, whose selection split the local Conservative Association. A group broke away to form the Newcastle North (1940) Conservative Association, and they fielded Sir Cuthbert Headlam as an "Independent Conservative" candidate.

Headlam had been MP for Barnard Castle from 1924 to 1929 and from 1931 to 1935, and had held several junior ministerial posts.  He had also contested the Gateshead by-election in 1931, coming a close second in what had been a safe seat for Labour.

Results
On a very low turnout, the result was an overwhelming victory for Headlam, who took 71% of the votes.  Returned to the House of Commons, he promptly took the Conservative Whip, and held the seat as a Conservative until he retired from Parliament at the 1951 election.

Votes

See also
 Newcastle upon Tyne North constituency
 1957 Newcastle upon Tyne North by-election
 Newcastle upon Tyne
 List of United Kingdom by-elections (1931–1950)
 United Kingdom by-election records

References
 
 

1940 elections in the United Kingdom
1940 in England
20th century in Newcastle upon Tyne
Elections in Newcastle upon Tyne
By-elections to the Parliament of the United Kingdom in Northumberland constituencies
June 1940 events